Sara Bender is an Israeli historian. She edits the journal Dapim - Studies on the Holocaust.

Works

References

Israeli historians
Israeli women historians
Historians of the Holocaust
Historians of Poland
Year of birth missing (living people)
Living people